Sumaq is an academic alliance comprising eight leading business schools in Latin America and Spain.

It was founded in 2002 by IE Business School as a response to the needs of executive education in growing multinationals.

Mission

According to Sumaq, its mission is:

Members

 IE Business School (Madrid, Spain)
 University of the Andes, Colombia (Bogota, Colombia)
 Instituto de Estudios Superiores de Administración (Caracas, Venezuela)
 University of San Andres (Buenos Aires, Argentina)
 EGADE (several locations in Mexico and Latin America)
 INCAE (Alajuela, Costa Rica and Managua, Nicaragua)
 EAESP, Fundação Getúlio Vargas (São Paulo, Brasil)
 Pontifical Catholic University of Chile (Santiago de Chile, Chile)

References 

Education in Spain